Filmore Township is one of eight townships in Bollinger County, Missouri, USA. As of the 2000 U.S. Census, its population was 508. As of the 2010 U.S. Census, the population had decreased to 488.

Filmore Township was established in 1851, and named in honor President Millard Fillmore.

Demographics
As of the 2010 U.S. Census, there were 488 people living in the township. The population density was 8.03 people per square mile (12.92/km2). There were 308 housing units in the township. The racial makeup of the township was 96.31% White, 0.20% Black or African American, 2.05% Native American, 0.20% from other races, and 1.23% from two or more races. Approximately 0.20% of the population were Hispanic or Latino of any race.

Geography

Incorporated Areas
The township contains no incorporated settlements.

Unincorporated Areas
The township contains the following two unincorporated areas and historical communities: 
Buchanan at 
Grassy at

Cemeteries
The township contains the following six cemeteries: Kinder Chapel, Burk, Mouser, Patterson, Ray, and Scott.

Streams
The streams of Castor River, Grassy Creek, Little Grassy Creek, Perkins Creek, and Trace Creek flow through Filmore Township.

Landmarks
Arrowhead Campground 
Blue Pond 
Castor River  
Castor River Conservation Area 
Castor River Park 
Twin Bridges Campground

Transportation
  Missouri Route 34

Administrative Districts

School Districts
Woodland R-IV School District 
Zalma R-V School District

Political Districts
Missouri's 8th Congressional District
State House District 145 
State Senate District 27

References
 United States Census Bureau 2008 TIGER/Line Shapefiles
 United States Board on Geographic Names (GNIS)
 United States National Atlas

External links
 US-Counties.com
 City-Data.com

Townships in Bollinger County, Missouri
Townships in Missouri
1851 establishments in Missouri